Adam Fletcher is a writer, speaker and consultant focused on youth voice and student engagement, and recognized for founding The Freechild Project.

His work centers on youth studies, critical thinking and the development of democratic society, and has been acknowledged as "perhaps the best spokesman for the philosophical basis of community youth development". Action for Healthy Kids named him a "Healthy Schools Hero" in 2010.

Fletcher was a youth worker in several nonprofit organizations and in government agencies for more than a decade. He completed his undergraduate degree in critical pedagogy and youth studies at The Evergreen State College, and conducted graduate studies at the University of Washington in educational leadership and policy studies. He graduated from Omaha North High School in North Omaha, Nebraska.

Since 2007, Fletcher has been the owner and lead consultant of CommonAction Consulting. Working with educators and government administrators around the world, his consultancy focuses on democratic education. Additionally, he regularly speaks at local, state, national and international conferences across North America, in Brazil and beyond.

Fletcher has also served as a director and advisor to several organizations including the National Youth Rights Association and others, and is a contributing editor to the Review of Education, Pedagogy and Cultural Studies, published by Taylor and Francis. He has written more than 50 publications related to education, youth work and social change.

Select bibliography 
 North Omaha History, Volume Three (2016) 
 North Omaha History, Volume Two (2016) 
 North Omaha History, Volume One (2016) 
 Facing Adultism (2015) 
 The Guide to Student Voice, 2nd edition. (2014) 
 The Practice of Youth Engagement (2014) 
 School Boards of the Future: A Guide to Students as Education Decision-Makers (2014) 
 The Freechild Project Guide to Youth-Driven Programming. (2013) 
 Suffering Love, Laughing at Myself (2013) 
 SoundOut Student Voice Curriculum. (2007)

References

External links 
 Adam Fletcher website

Canadian educational theorists
Canadian activists
Writers from Olympia, Washington
Writers from Calgary
Canadian social sciences writers
Youth empowerment people
Youth rights people
Canadian expatriates in the United States
Evergreen State College alumni
1975 births
Canadian consultants
Living people
Omaha North High School alumni